Aleksandr Nikolayevich Sonin (born 6 August 1983) is a Russian former professional footballer.

Club career
He made his professional debut in the Russian Premier League in 2001 for FC Spartak Moscow. He played 2 games in the UEFA Champions League 2002–03 for FC Spartak Moscow.

Honours
 Russian Premier League champion: 2001.
 Russian Premier League bronze: 2002.
 Russian Cup winner: 2003.

References

1983 births
People from Zheleznogorsk, Kursk Oblast
Living people
Russian footballers
Russia youth international footballers
Russia under-21 international footballers
Association football forwards
Russian expatriate footballers
Expatriate footballers in France
Expatriate footballers in Ukraine
Expatriate footballers in Latvia
Russian Premier League players
Ukrainian Premier League players
FC Spartak Moscow players
FC Arsenal Kyiv players
FC Daugava players
FC Shinnik Yaroslavl players
FC Nizhny Novgorod (2007) players
FC Dynamo-2 Kyiv players
Sportspeople from Kursk Oblast